İsak Vural (born 28 May 2006) is a professional footballer who plays as a midfielder for Hammarby IF in Allsvenskan, on loan from Fenerbahçe. Born in Sweden, he represents Turkey at youth international level.

Club career

Early career
Born in Stockholm, Sweden, to a Turkish father and Swedish mother, Vural moved to Spain to start his career with Sant Cugat. In 2013, he returned to his native Sweden to join Hammarby IF, and his performances for their youth teams attracted attention from Spanish giants Barcelona. However, after Barcelona failed to meet the residence and work permit conditions, Vural moved to Portugal to sign for Benfica in 2018.

Fenerbahçe
On 28 February 2022, after four years in Benfica's youth academy, Vural moved to Turkey to sign for Fenerbahçe. Due to his ability and high potential, he immediately started training with the first team squad, rather than the youth team. On 19 April the same year, Vural made his unofficial debut in a 1–0 friendly win over Ukrainian side Shakhtar Donetsk. In doing so, he became the youngest player to ever represent Fenerbahçe at 15 years, 10 months and 23 days old.

Loan to Hammarby
On 4 February 2023, Vural returned to his boyhood club Hammarby on a one-year loan, being part of their senior squad in Allsvenskan.

International career
Vural is eligible to represent Sweden as his nation of birth, as well as Turkey or Norway through his parents. He has represented Turkey at under-16 level.

References

External links
 

 

2006 births
Living people
Footballers from Stockholm
Turkish footballers
Turkey youth international footballers
Swedish footballers
Turkish people of Norwegian descent
Swedish people of Turkish descent
Swedish people of Norwegian descent
Association football midfielders
Hammarby Fotboll players
S.L. Benfica footballers
Fenerbahçe S.K. footballers
Swedish expatriate footballers
Swedish expatriate sportspeople in Spain
Swedish expatriate sportspeople in Portugal
Turkish expatriate footballers
Turkish expatriate sportspeople in Spain
Turkish expatriate sportspeople in Portugal
Expatriate footballers in Spain
Expatriate footballers in Portugal